The 1992–93 NCAA Division III men's ice hockey season began in October 1992 and concluded on March 27 of the following year. This was the 20th season of Division III college ice hockey.

The NCAA restarted the Division II Championship for this season and all programs from Division II schools were required to submit bids to the second-tier championship despite continuing to play in a majority Division III conference. Due to the low number and sometimes vast distance between the schools, no Division II conferences were formed, even from the few programs that became independent. The records for all Division II schools that remained in their previous conferences are listed here.

Due in part to this new arrangement, ECAC West split and the State University of New York Athletic Conference began officially sponsoring ice hockey. While both conferences, along with ECAC East fell under the ECAC umbrella, ECAC East stopped counting inter-conference games in their standings while ECAC West continued to count games against SUNYAC teams for this season before dropping the practice entirely. The SUNYAC had already been holding a conference schedule to determine which teams participated in the SUNYAC tournament and the conference simply stopped counting non-SUNYAC games for their standings.

The NCAA began naming a national Division III player of the year, a counterpart to the Hobey Baker Award.

Regular season

Season tournaments

Standings

Note: Mini-game are not included in final standings

1993 NCAA tournament

Note: * denotes overtime period(s)

See also
 1992–93 NCAA Division I men's ice hockey season
 1992–93 NCAA Division II men's ice hockey season

References

 
NCAA